The name Escapa (meaning "escape") is shared by:

 Amancio Escapa Aparicio, Roman Catholic bishop
 Joseph Escapa (c. 1572–1662), Macedonian rabbi
 Michal Escapa (born 1937), Israeli paralympic multi-sport athlete